Gilles Savary (born 6 December 1954 in Oradour-sur-Vayres, Haute-Vienne) is a French politician and former Member of the European Parliament for the Île-de-France. He is a member of the Socialist Party, which is part of the Party of European Socialists, and was vice-chair of the European Parliament's Committee on Transport and Tourism.

He was also a substitute for the Committee on Economic and Monetary Affairs, a member of the delegation for relations with Iran, and a member of the temporary committee on policy challenges and budgetary means of the enlarged Union 2007–2013.

Career 
 Master's degree in economics (1975)
 Specialised higher degree (DESS) in regional planning and regional development (1976)
 Postgraduate diploma (DEA) in regional and urban analysis (1977)
 Technical adviser in the office of the Chairman of the Aquitaine Regional Council (1982–1985), then in the office of the Chairman of the Tarn-et-Garonne Regional Council (1985–1987), then in the office of the State Secretary for Local Government Administration at the Ministry of the Interior (1988)
 Head of the office of the Chairman of the Gironde Regional Council (1988–1992)
 Visiting lecturer in economics, Bordeaux Institute of Political Studies (1992–1999)
 Member of the Socialist Party national council (since 1997)
 National responsibility in the Socialist Party for public services (2001–2003)
 Vice-Chairman of the National Federation of Socialist and Republican Elected Representatives (1997–2001)
 Leader of the Socialist Group on Bordeaux City Council (1995–2004)
 Vice-Chairman of the Gironde Departmental Council (since 2004)
 Vice-Chairman of the Aquitaine Regional Council (1998–1999)
 Member of the European Parliament (from 1999 to 2009)
 Vice-Chairman of the Committee on Transport, Tourism and Regional Policy (1999–2009) and Chairman of the Intergroup on the Sky and Space (2000–2004)
 Knight of the National Order of Merit (1999)
 Deputy for Gironde's 9th constituency (2012-2017)
Chair of Territories of Progress (2020 to present)

External links 
 Official website (in French)
 European Parliament biography
 Declaration of financial interests (in French; PDF file)

1954 births
Living people
People from Haute-Vienne
MEPs for France 1999–2004
Socialist Party (France) MEPs
MEPs for Île-de-France 2004–2009
Deputies of the 14th National Assembly of the French Fifth Republic